Grochowo Drugie  is a village in the administrative district of Gmina Sztutowo, within Nowy Dwór Gdański County, Pomeranian Voivodeship, in northern Poland.

References

Grochowo Drugie